Cyperus hirtellus is a species of sedge that is native to parts of Africa.

See also 
 List of Cyperus species

References 

hirtellus
Plants described in 1935
Flora of Tanzania
Flora of Uganda
Flora of Zimbabwe
Flora of the Democratic Republic of the Congo
Taxa named by Georg Kükenthal